Madan-e Abdasht (also Romanized as Maʿdan-e Ābdasht) is a village in Soghan Rural District, Soghan District, Arzuiyeh County, Kerman Province, Iran. At the 2006 census, its population was 1,084, in 229 families.

References 

Populated places in Arzuiyeh County